Städtisches Kunsteisstadion is an arena in Bayreuth, Germany.  It is primarily used for ice hockey. Kunsteisstadion opened in 1976 and holds 4,730 people.

External links 
 Arena information

Indoor arenas in Germany
Indoor ice hockey venues in Germany
Buildings and structures in Bayreuth
Sports venues in Bavaria
Sports venues completed in 1976
1976 establishments in West Germany